The R.O. Phillips House is a historic house in Lincoln, Nebraska. It was built in 1889 for R.O. Phillips, a railroad lawyer who served as a member of the Nebraska House of Representatives. The house was designed in the Richardsonian Romanesque style by architect J. H. W. Hawkins. It has been listed on the National Register of Historic Places since November 29, 1979.

References

		
National Register of Historic Places in Lincoln, Nebraska
Romanesque Revival architecture in Nebraska
Houses completed in 1889